Mid-Ohio Sports Car Course is a road course auto racing facility located in Troy Township, Morrow County, Ohio, United States, just outside the village of Lexington. Mid-Ohio has also colloquially become a term for the entire north-central region of the state, from south of Sandusky to the north of Columbus. It hosts a number of racing series such as IndyCar, IMSA WeatherTech Sportscar Championship, and the NASCAR Xfinity Series, along with other club events such has SCCA and National Auto Sport Association.

The track 

The track opened as a 15-turn,  road circuit run clockwise. The back portion of the track allows speeds approaching . A separate starting line is located on the backstretch to allow for safer rolling starts. The regular start/finish line is located on the pit straight.

In 1990 the track underwent a refurbishment. A new retaining wall was built, the entire track was resurfaced, widened and concrete was paved in the apexes of the turns to prevent asphalt deterioration. In addition, a straightaway was paved through the chicane, allowing for two different track layouts, the original  circuit and a new 13-turn,  circuit. In 1990, the CART series, along with other racing series, began utilizing the  layout.

In 2006 a second major refurbishment saw several improvements. The entire circuit was repaved and the concrete patches in the turn apexes were removed. A new motorcycle "short course" was created by connecting turn one with the backstretch and another motorcycle oval was created by connecting the chicane straight with the backstretch. The additional layouts allow simultaneous use of the multiple course, for instructional and competitive uses. The improvements also included a motocross facility, that has since been used for the AMA Vintage Motorcycle days event.

In 2019 the ARX came to the track which was the first time rallycross had come to the circuit. The course was a 10-turn,  and utilized the keyhole section of the track.

There is grandstand seating for 12,000 spectators and three observation mounds alongside the track raise the capacity to over 75,000. Mid-Ohio is classified as an FIA Grade Two circuit.

History 

The track was opened in 1962 by Les Griebling and several Mansfield-area businessmen as a location for weekend sports car racing. The track originally had 16 turns, with a left turn in what is today known as "thunder valley," but the turn was straightened after just one year of operation due to complaints of the track being too slow. The track hosted Can-am and F5000 through the 1970s and in 1980, it would host its first CART race with Johnny Rutherford taking victory with Chaparral.

In 1982 Mid-Ohio was purchased by Jim Trueman, a renowned road racer and the founder of Red Roof Inns. Trueman added permanent grandstands, amphitheater-style seating, garages with spectator balconies, a five-story media and hospitality center, tunnels and an updated paddock area. In addition, a tall, three-sided scoreboard tower was constructed in the infield, strategically placed such that it was visible from nearly all spectator areas around the track. In 1986 Trueman had died from cancer, making his wife and daughter taking over management for the facility. In 1989 Truman's daughter, Michelle Trueman, was named the president of the circuit in 1989 and saw day-to-day operations of the track.

In 1990 the track underwent a refurbishment. A new retaining wall was built, the entire track was resurfaced, widened, and concrete was paved in the apexes of the turns to prevent asphalt deterioration. In addition, a straightaway was paved through the chicane, allowing for two different track layouts, the original  circuit and a new 13-turn,  circuit.

In 2006 the track again underwent extensive renovation. The track and pit lane were completely resurfaced and connectors were added to the track's famed Keyhole section to allow for three separate road course configurations. Also completed was the removal of concrete patches from the track, the relocation of the wall and guardrail at Turn 1, the expansion of gravel traps at the exits of Turn 1 and the keyhole, the replacement of all remaining old-style catch fencing and the standardization of curbing throughout the circuit. These changes have resulted in a faster, safer, more competitive and attractive facility for drivers, riders and race fans.

On March 2, 2011, it was announced that the track had been purchased from Truesports by Green Savoree Racing Promotions, which also promotes other IndyCar races, ending Truesports' 29 years of ownership.

Race history

The course had first hosted SportsCar racing in 1963 as part of the United States Road Racing Championship. The race would be held until the race series was folded in 1968, but the race would return as a 6-hour enduro under the IMSA GT championship in 1972. The track would also hold the U.S. Formula 5000 series from 1970 to 1976 and was replaced by the revived Can-Am series in 1977–1980. The track continued to host IMSA GT until 1993, and would not return until 2000 with Grand-Am Rolex Sports Car Series. The track would also add the American Le Mans series the next year. The track continued to host the two series until 2012 when ALMS dropped the race, Grand-Am would follow suit the next year. In 2018, track would host the WeatherTech SportsCar championship.

There would be a brief hiatus as the race would not return until 1983, and the race would be extended as a  race. CART appeared annually until 2003, when CART president Chris Pook hinted at dropping Mid-Ohio from the CART schedule going forward, citing various issues. For many years, Mid-Ohio was on the schedule alongside the Grand Prix of Cleveland, and Pook stated it was not viable to have two races in such close proximity, and favored keeping the race at Cleveland instead. In addition, some observers felt that the powerful Champ Cars had "outgrown" the narrow, winding course, citing a lack of passing and competition over the previous several years. The race would return in 2007 under the Indy racing league and would partner as a doubleheader with the American Le Mans Series until 2012 when ALMS dropped the circuit from the calendar. The race has also featured support series such as the Road to Indy, Global Mazda MX-5 Cup, and Stadium Super Trucks. In 2015, hometown favorite Graham Rahal won at Mid-Ohio for the first time, thirty years after his father, Bobby Rahal, won his first race at the track. Scott Dixon has the most wins at the track with six.

In 2013, the track hosted its first NASCAR event as a  race with the NASCAR Xfinity Series. The race has partnered with Trans-Am, Stadium Super Trucks, F4 United States Championship and partnered ARCA in 2020. Unlike most of the events held at the track, the Xfinity Series uses the normal start/finish line located on the pit straight to start the races, instead of the start line on the back straight. NASCAR realigned the race in 2022, moving it to the NASCAR Camping World Truck Series.

Lap Records

The unofficial lap record is 1:03.8700, set by Simon Pagenaud during the qualifying of the 2016 Honda Indy 200. The fastest official race lap records on the Mid-Ohio Sports Car Course are listed as:

The Mid-Ohio School
Founded in 1993, The Mid-Ohio School offers licensed drivers and motorcycle riders programs in defensive driving, high performance driving and performance track riding programs. Students in each course partake in classroom and private instruction and group drills. Participants test their newly refined skills in the controlled environment of the facility's Vehicle Dynamics Center and on the track.

The Mid-Ohio School is AAA Approved and recognized as a recent recipient of the Ohio State Highway Patrol's Partners for Safety award. 18 programs are available to drivers and riders of all ages and ability levels from defensive driving programs for teens and adults, on-track high performance courses for the automotive enthusiasts to current and aspiring racers.

There have been over 50,000 graduates from the Mid-Ohio School, including 18,500 teenagers and 13,300 motorcycle riders.

Notes

References

External links 

Mid-Ohio Sports Car Course – official site of Mid-Ohio Sports Car Course
Map and circuit history at RacingCircuits.info

The Mid-Ohio School – official site of The Mid-Ohio School
1tail Resource Database: Mid-Ohio Sports Car Course

Champ Car circuits
Buildings and structures in Morrow County, Ohio
Motorsport venues in Ohio
International Race of Champions tracks
IndyCar Series tracks
American Le Mans Series circuits
IMSA GT Championship circuits
Tourist attractions in Morrow County, Ohio
Sports venues completed in 1962
1962 establishments in Ohio
NASCAR tracks
ARCA Menards Series tracks
Road courses in the United States